Yerba mate or yerba-maté (Ilex paraguariensis; from Spanish ; ,  or ;) is a plant species of the holly genus Ilex native to South America. It was named by the French botanist Augustin Saint-Hilaire. The leaves of the plant can be steeped in hot water to make a beverage known as mate. Brewed cold, it is used to make tereré. Both the plant and the beverage contain caffeine.

The indigenous Guaraní and some Tupí communities (whose territory covered present-day Paraguay) first cultivated and consumed yerba mate prior to European colonization of the Americas. Its consumption was exclusive to the natives of only two regions of the territory that today is Paraguay, more specifically the departments of Amambay and Alto Paraná. After the Jesuits discovered its commercialization potential, yerba mate became widespread throughout the province and even elsewhere in the Spanish Crown. 

Mate is traditionally consumed in central and southern regions of South America, primarily in Paraguay, as well as in Argentina, Uruguay, Southern Brazil, the Gran Chaco of Bolivia, and southern Chile. It has also become popular in the Druze and Alawite community in the Levant, especially in Syria and Lebanon, where it is imported from Paraguay and Argentina, thanks to 19th-century Syrian immigrants to Argentina. Yerba mate can now be found worldwide in various energy drinks as well as being sold as a bottled or canned iced tea.

Name and pronunciation
, in Portuguese, a term describing several herb species, is derived from the Tupí expression , meaning something like 'what keeps us alive', but is rarely used nowadays. Mate is from the Quechua , a word that means 'container for a drink' and 'infusion of an herb', as well as 'gourd'. The word mate is used in modern Portuguese and Spanish.

The accent on the word mAte is on the first syllable. Yerba may be understood as 'herb', but also as 'grass' or 'weed'. It may also be used in reference to marijuana (Cannabis sativa). In Argentina,  refers exclusively to the  plant. , therefore, originally translated as literally the 'gourd herb'; i.e., the herb one drinks from a gourd.

'mate tea', served in cups or glasses). While  is made with roasted leaves, the other drinks are made with raw or lightly toasted green leaves, and are very popular in the south and center-west of the country. Most people, colloquially, call both the plant and the beverage by the word .

In English, both the spellings mate and maté are used to refer to the plant or beverage; however, the latter spelling is incorrect—in both Spanish and Portuguese—as it would put the stress on the second syllable, while the word is correctly pronounced with the stress on the first syllable (like “máte”). The addition of the acute accent over the final "e", in the Anglo spelling, was likely added as a hypercorrection to indicate that the final "-é" is not silent, as in “mate” (partner or friend).

There are no variations in spelling of mate (the plant) in Spanish. In both Spanish and Portuguese, the first syllable of mate (plant) is the tonic one, and the word does not require a written accent. If the tonic syllable were the last one, the accent would be required, as maté.

Description
They contain caffeine (known in some parts of the world as mateine) and related xanthine alkaloids, and are harvested commercially.

The flowers are small and greenish-white with four petals. The fruit is a red drupe  in diameter.

History

Mate was first consumed by the indigenous Guaraní people and also spread in the Tupí people that lived in the departments of Amambay and Alto Paraná the territory of Paraguay. Its consumption became widespread during European colonization, particularly in the Spanish colony of Paraguay in the late 16th century, among both Spanish settlers and indigenous Guaraní, who had, to some extent before the Spanish arrival, consumed it. This widespread consumption turned it into Paraguay's main commodity above other wares, such as tobacco, and the labour of indigenous peoples was used to harvest wild stands.

In the mid-17th century, Jesuits managed to domesticate the plant and establish plantations in their Indian reductions in Misiones, Argentina, sparking severe competition with the Paraguayan harvesters of wild stands.  It is here when the plant began its incursion into other non-Paraguayan territories. After their expulsion in the 1770s, their plantations fell into decay, as did their domestication secrets. The industry continued to be of prime importance for the Paraguayan economy after independence, but development in benefit of the Paraguayan state halted after the War of the Triple Alliance (1864–1870) that devastated the country both economically and demographically. Some regions with mate plantations in Paraguay became Argentine territory.

Brazil then became the largest producer of mate. In Brazilian and Argentine projects in the late 19th and early 20th centuries, the plant was domesticated once again, opening the way for plantation systems. When Brazilian entrepreneurs turned their attention to coffee in the 1930s, Argentina, which had long been the prime consumer, took over as the largest producer, resurrecting the economy in Misiones Province, where the Jesuits had once had most of their plantations. For years, the status of largest producer shifted between Brazil and Argentina. Today, Brazil is the largest producer, with 53%, followed by Argentina, 37%, and Paraguay, 10%.

In the city of Campo Largo, state of Paraná, Brazil, there is a Mate Historic Park, funded by the state government to educate people on the sustainable harvesting methods needed to maintain the integrity and vitality of the oldest wild forests of mate in the world. As of June 2014, however, the park is closed to public visitation.

Cultivation

Seeds used to germinate new plants are harvested after they have turned dark purple, typically from January to April. After harvest, they are submerged in water in order to eliminate floating non-viable seeds and detritus like twigs, leaves, etc. New plants are started between March and May. For plants established in pots, transplanting takes place April through September. Plants with bare roots are transplanted only during the months of June and July.

Many of the natural enemies of yerba mate are difficult to control in plantation settings. Insect pests include Gyropsylla spegazziniana, a true bug that lays eggs in the branches; Hedyphates betulinus, a type of beetle that weakens the tree and makes it more susceptible to mold and mildew; Perigonia lusca, a moth whose larvae eat the leaves; and several species of mites. P. lusca may be controlled with a nuclear polyhedrosis virus used as a biopesticide. This was first applied in 1992.

When I. paraguariensis is harvested, the branches are often dried by a wood fire, imparting a smoky flavor. The strength of the flavor, caffeine levels, and other nutrients can vary depending on whether it is a male or female plant. Female plants tend to be milder in flavor and lower in caffeine. They are also relatively scarce in the areas where yerba mate is planted and cultivated.

According to FAO in 2012, Brazil is the biggest producer of mate in the world with 513,256 MT (58%), followed by Argentina with 290,000 MT (32%) and Paraguay with 85,490 MT (10%).

Use as a beverage

Sugar may or may not be added.

Drinking mate is a common social practice in Paraguay, Uruguay, Argentina, Southern Brazil among people of all ages, and is often a communal ritual following customary rules. The gourd is given by the brewer to each person, often in a circle, in turns. The recipient drinks the few mouthfuls in the container, and then returns the mate to the brewer, who refills it and passes it to the next person in clockwise order. The recipient is not supposed to give thanks until they are done drinking the beverage, and if they do, they will not be served any more mates. Although traditionally made from a hollowed calabash gourd, these days mate "gourds" are produced from a variety of materials including wood, glass, bull horns, ceramic, and silicone.

In the same way as people meet for tea or coffee, friends often gather and drink mate in Paraguay, Argentina, Southern Brazil, and Uruguay. In warm weather the hot water is sometimes replaced by lemonade. Paraguayans typically drink yerba mate with cold water during hot days and hot water in the morning and during cooler temperatures.

The amount of herb used to prepare the infusion is much greater than that used for tea and other beverages, which accounts for the large weights.

The flavor of brewed mate resembles an infusion of vegetables, herbs, and grass and is reminiscent of some varieties of green tea. Some consider the flavor to be very agreeable, but it is generally bitter if steeped in hot water. Sweetened and flavored mate is also sold, in which the mate leaves are blended with other herbs (such as peppermint) or citrus rind.

It is often served sweetened in specialized shops or on the street, either hot or iced, pure or with fruit juice (especially lime, known in Brazil as ) or milk. In Paraguay, Argentina, and Southern Brazil, this is commonly consumed for breakfast or in a café for afternoon tea, often with a selection of sweet pastries (facturas).

An iced, sweetened version of mate cocido is sold as an uncarbonated soft drink, with or without fruit flavoring. , which is toasted, has less of a bitter flavor and more of a spicy fragrance.  becomes creamy when shaken and is more popular in the coastal cities of Brazil, as opposed to the far southern states, where it is more commonly consumed in the traditional way (green, with a silver straw from a shared gourd), and called  ( in Spanish, particularly Argentine Spanish).

The Guarani used to drink it in this format, but without the ice as they did not have the technology for it, reason why, it is accredited to be the first and original way of consumption.  can be prepared with cold water (the most common way in Paraguay and Brazil) or fruit juice (the most common way in Argentina). The version with water is more bitter; fruit juice acts as a sweetener (in Brazil, this is usually avoided with the addition of table sugar).

Modifying mate in this fashion is potentially toxic, as these alkaloids can cause veno-occlusive disease, a rare condition of the liver which results in liver failure due to progressive occlusion of the small venous channels.

Mate has also become popular outside of South America. In the tiny hamlet of Groot Marico, North West Province, South Africa, mate was introduced to the local tourism office by the returning descendants of the Boers, who in 1902 had emigrated to Patagonia in Argentina after losing the Anglo Boer War. It is also commonly consumed in Lebanon, Syria, and some other parts of the Middle East, mainly by Druze and Alawite people. Most of its popularity outside South America is a result of historical emigration to South America and subsequent return. It is consumed worldwide by expatriates from the Southern Cone.

Materva is a sweet, carbonated soft drink based on yerba mate. Developed in Cuba in 1920, and produced since the 1960s in Miami, Florida, it is a staple of the Cuban culture in Miami.

Chemical composition and properties
Yerba mate contains a variety of polyphenols such as the flavonoids quercetin and rutin.

Yerba mate contains three xanthines: caffeine, theobromine, and theophylline, the main one being caffeine. Caffeine content varies between 0.7% and 1.7% of dry weight (compared with 0.4–9.3% for tea leaves, 2.5–7.6% in guarana, and up to 3.2% for ground coffee), concentrated in the leaves; theobromine content varies from 0.3% to 0.9%; theophylline is typically present only in small quantities or sometimes completely absent. A substance previously called mateine is a synonym for caffeine (like theine and guaranine).

Yerba mate also contains elements such as potassium, magnesium, and manganese.

Weight loss
There is no good evidence for yerba mate having an effect on body weight in humans.

Cancer

The consumption of hot mate tea is associated with oral cancer, esophageal cancer, cancer of the larynx, and squamous cell cancers of the head and neck. Studies show a correlation between tea temperature and likelihood of cancer, making it unclear how much of a role mate itself plays as a carcinogen. However, studies also note that incidents of cancer overlap with the use of alcohol, tobacco, the presence of nutritional deficiencies, and poor oral hygiene – not mate use alone.

See also

 Black drink
 Club-Mate
 Matte Leão
 Ilex guayusa, known as guayusa, another caffeine-containing holly species of the Ilex genus, native to the Ecuadorian Amazon rainforest
 Ilex vomitoria, a caffeine-containing species of the Ilex genus native to North America
 Kuding, Ilex kudingcha
 Materva, a mate soft drink
 Nativa
 Guayaki, a brand of drinks based out of California

References

 
Ilex
Flora of Argentina
Flora of Brazil
Trees of Brazil
Flora of Paraguay
Flora of Uruguay
Flora of the Atlantic Forest
Flora of the Cerrado
Latin American cuisine
Caffeine
Herbal and fungal stimulants
Herbal tea
Medicinal plants
Crops originating from the Americas
Crops originating from Brazil
Crops originating from Argentina
Crops originating from Uruguay
Crops originating from Paraguay
Near threatened plants
Agriculture in Brazil
Agriculture in Argentina
Agriculture in Paraguay